Farewell Ceremony for His Majesty Emir of Bukhara on Velikiy Kniaz Alexei Steamboat (Azerbaijani: Əlahəzrət Buxara Əmirinin Veliki Knyaz Aleksey Paroxodunda Yolasalma Mərasimi) (1898) is one of the earliest films ever produced in the Cinema of Azerbaijan directed by Azeri cinema pioneer Aleksandr Mişon. It was released in 1898.

The film was shot on 35mm.

See also
List of Azerbaijani films: 1898-1919

Azerbaijani silent films
1898 films
Azerbaijani black-and-white films
Films of the Russian Empire